Saedah Abdul Rahim is a former Malaysian international lawn bowler.

Bowls career
In 1998 Saedah won the Women's singles silver medal at the 1998 Commonwealth Games in Kuala Lumpur. She lost in the final to Lesley Hartwell of South Africa despite leading the match 11-3.

Saedah, was a bronze medallist at the 1995 and 1997 Asia Pacific Bowls Championships in Dunedin and Warilla respectively.

References

Living people
Malaysian female bowls players
Commonwealth Games medallists in lawn bowls
Commonwealth Games silver medallists for Malaysia
1968 births
Bowls players at the 1998 Commonwealth Games
Southeast Asian Games medalists in lawn bowls
Competitors at the 1999 Southeast Asian Games
Southeast Asian Games silver medalists for Malaysia
20th-century Malaysian women
Medallists at the 1998 Commonwealth Games